Nathaniel Fakahafua Orchard (born Napa'a Lilo Fakahafua on January 5, 1993) is an American football defensive end who is a free agent. He played college football at Utah and was drafted by the Cleveland Browns in the second round of the 2015 NFL Draft. He has also played for the Buffalo Bills, Kansas City Chiefs, Seattle Seahawks, Miami Dolphins, Green Bay Packers, Washington Redskins / Football Team, Houston Texans, and Tennessee Titans.

Early years
Orchard is of Tongan descent. He attended Highland High School in Salt Lake City, Utah. He played football, basketball and competed in track. In football, he played as a wide receiver and defensive end. As a senior, he had 58 receptions for 1,351 yards and 17 touchdowns on offense and 62 tackles, 17.5 sacks and two interceptions on defense. In track & field, Orchard competed as a sprinter and posted personal-bests of 11.9 seconds in the 100-meter dash and 54.3 seconds in the 400-meter dash at the 2009 Region VI T&F Championships.

Considered a three-star recruit by Rivals.com, Orchard was ranked as the No. 60 wide receiver in his class.

College career
As a true freshman at the University of Utah in 2011, Orchard played in all 13 games, recording four tackles. As a sophomore in 2012, he started 11 of the 12 games, recording 48 tackles, three sacks and a touchdown on a fumble recovery. As a junior in 2013, he started all 12 games, recording 49 tackles and 3.5 sacks. Orchard entered his senior season in 2014 as a starter. In his senior season, Orchard recorded 84 tackles, 21 tackles for loss, and 18.5 sacks. Orchard won the Ted Hendricks Award for his performance.

Professional career

Cleveland Browns
The Cleveland Browns picked Orchard in the second round of the 2015 NFL draft. On May 6, he signed a four-year contract worth $4.466 million, which included a $1.058 million signing bonus. At least $2.581 million of Orchard's contract is guaranteed. On October 1, 2016, Orchard was placed on injured reserve.

On September 1, 2018, Orchard was released by the Browns.

Buffalo Bills
On September 10, 2018 he was signed by the Buffalo Bills. He was released by the Bills on October 2, 2018.

Kansas City Chiefs
On October 10, 2018, Orchard was signed by the Kansas City Chiefs. He was released on November 6, 2018.

Seattle Seahawks
On April 4, 2019, Orchard was signed by the Seattle Seahawks. He was released on May 10, 2019.

Miami Dolphins
On May 15, 2019, Orchard was signed by the Miami Dolphins. He was released on September 3, 2019.

Washington Redskins / Football Team
On November 27, 2019, Orchard was signed by the Washington Redskins.
In Week 13 against the Carolina Panthers, Orchard sacked quarterback Kyle Allen once and recovered a fumble forced on Allen by teammate Chris Odom late in the fourth quarter to seal a 29–21 win.

Orchard re-signed with the team on March 25, 2020. He was released on September 5, 2020, and was signed to the practice squad the next day. He was promoted to the active roster on September 29, 2020. He was waived on November 7, 2020.

Houston Texans
Orchard was claimed off waivers by the Houston Texans on November 9, 2020. He was waived on December 12, 2020.

Tennessee Titans
Orchard was signed by the Tennessee Titans to their practice squad on December 19, 2020. He was signed to a futures contract on January 11, 2021. On May 10, 2021, Orchard was released by Tennessee.

Minnesota Vikings
On November 4, 2021, Orchard was signed to the Minnesota Vikings practice squad. He was released on November 19.

Green Bay Packers
On November 25, 2021, Orchard was signed to the Green Bay Packers practice squad.

Washington Football Team (second stint)
The Washington Football Team signed Orchard off the Packers' practice squad on December 14, 2021.

Personal life
Orchard legally changed his name from Napa'a Lilo Fakahafua to Nathaniel Fakahafua Orchard in honor of his adopted family. He is married to Maegan Webber Orchard and has a daughter named Katherine Mae Orchard (named after his mother Katherine), a daughter named Charlotte Orchard and a son, Bo Webber Orchard.

References

External links
 Utah Utes bio

1993 births
Living people
American football defensive ends
American people of Tongan descent
Players of American football from Los Angeles
Players of American football from Salt Lake City
Utah Utes football players
Cleveland Browns players
Buffalo Bills players
Kansas City Chiefs players
Seattle Seahawks players
Miami Dolphins players
Washington Redskins players
American football outside linebackers
Washington Football Team players
Houston Texans players
Tennessee Titans players
Minnesota Vikings players
Green Bay Packers players